Chidinma Leilani Aaron (born 16 April 1993) is a Nigerian model, entrepreneur, chef, business development manager and motivational speaker.

Early life and education
Chidinma was born in Kaduna, Kaduna State and raised in the Federal Capital Territory, Abuja, Nigeria. She is one of three sisters and a brother. She later moved to Ibadan, Oyo State and attended Lead City University, where she graduated with a bachelor of science degree in Business Administration in 2017.

Prior to winning Miss Nigeria, she worked as a chef and a customer relationship manager at Yumme Meals, a catering and confectionery outfit located in F.C.T., Abuja.

References

External links
 

1993 births
Nigerian businesspeople
Lead City University alumni
Miss Nigeria winners
People from Enugu State
Living people
Nigerian female models
Igbo people